The 21st Filmfare Awards were held in 1974.

Anuraag won Best Film, but fail to win any other awards, a feat which was repeated by a few films in the 1970s.

Bobby led the ceremony with 14 nominations, followed by Zanjeer with 9 nominations and Daag: A Poem of Love with 7 nominations.

Bobby won 5 awards, including Best Actor (for Rishi Kapoor), Best Actress (for Dimple Kapadia) and Best Male Playback Singer (Narendra Chanchal for "Beshak Mandir Masjid"), thus becoming the most-awarded film at the ceremony.

For the first time in the history of the Filmfare Awards, there was a tie for an acting award, when Dimple Kapadia and Jaya Bachchan tied for Best Actress for their performances in Bobby and Abhimaan respectively.

Gulzar received dual nominations for Best Director for his direction in Achanak and Koshish, but lost to Yash Chopra who won the award for Daag: A Poem of Love.

Nutan received dual nominations for Best Supporting Actress for her performances in Anuraag and Saudagar, in addition to a Best Actress nomination for Saudagar, but lost the former to Raakhee who won the award for Daag: A Poem of Love, and the latter to Dimple Kapadia and Jaya Bachchan for Bobby and Abhimaan respectively.

Main Awards

Best Film
 Anuraag 
Aaj Ki Taaza Khabar
Bobby
Daag: A Poem of Love
Koshish
Zanjeer

Best Director
 Yash Chopra – Daag: A Poem of Love 
Gulzar – Achanak
Gulzar – Koshish
Raj Kapoor – Bobby
Rajendra Bhatia – Aaj Ki Taaza Khabar

Best Actor
 Rishi Kapoor – Bobby
Amitabh Bachchan – Zanjeer
Dharmendra – Yaadon Ki Baarat
Rajesh Khanna – Daag: A Poem of Love
Sanjeev Kumar – Koshish

Best Actress 
 Dimple Kapadia – Bobby and Jaya Bachchan – Abhimaan (tie)
Jaya Bachchan – Koshish
Moushumi Chatterjee – Anuraag
Nutan – Saudagar
Sharmila Tagore – Daag: A Poem of Love

Best Supporting Actor
 Amitabh Bachchan – Namak Haraam 
Ashok Kumar – Victoria No. 203
Asrani – Abhimaan
Pran – Zanjeer
Premnath – Bobby

Best Supporting Actress
 Raakhee – Daag: A Poem of Love 
Aruna Irani – Bobby
Bindu – Abhimaan
Nutan – Anuraag
Nutan – Saudagar

Best Comic Actor
 Asrani – Aaj Ki Taaza Khabar 
Asrani – Namak Haraam
I. S. Johar – Aaj Ki Taaza Khabar
Mehmood – Do Phool
Pran – Victoria No. 203

Best Story
 Zanjeer – Salim–Javed 
Aaj Ki Taaza Khabar – Mulraj Razdan
Achanak – K.A. Abbas
Anuraag – Shakti Samanta
Koshish – Gulzar

Best Screenplay
 Zanjeer – Salim–Javed

Best Dialogue
 Namak Haraam – Gulzar

Best Music Director 
 Abhimaan – S.D. Burman 
Bobby – Laxmikant–Pyarelal
Daag: A Poem of Love – Laxmikant–Pyarelal
Yaadon Ki Baarat – R.D. Burman
Zanjeer – Kalyanji-Anandji

Best Lyricist
 Zanjeer – Gulshan Bawra for Yaari Hai Imaan Mera 
Bobby – Anand Bakshi for Hum Tum Ek Kamre Main
Bobby – Anand Bakshi for Main Shayar To Nahin
Bobby – Vithalbhai Patel for Jhoot Bole Kava Kaate
Samjhauta – Indeevar for Samjhauta Ghanmose Karlo

Best Playback Singer, Male
 Bobby – Narendra Chanchal for Beshak Mandir Masjid 
Bobby – Shailendra Singh for Main Shayar To Nahin
Daag: A Poem of Love – Kishore Kumar for Mere Dil Main Aaj
Naina – Mohammad Rafi for Hum Ko Jaan Se Pyaari
Zanjeer – Manna Dey for Yaari Hai Imaan Mera

Best Playback Singer, Female
 Naina – Asha Bhosle for Hone Lagi Hai Raat Jawaan 
Aa Gale Lag Ja – Sushma Shrestha for Tera Mujhse Hai
Anhonee – Asha Bhosle for Hungama Ho Gaya
Prem Parbat – Minoo Purshottam for Raat Piya Ke Sang
Raja Rani – Asha Bhosle for Jab Andhera Hota Hai

Best Art Direction
 Bobby

Best Cinematography
 Jheel Ke Us Paar

Best Editing
 Zanjeer

Best Sound
 Bobby

Critics' Awards

Best Film
 Duvidha

Best Documentary
 A Day With the Builders

Biggest winners
 Bobby – 5/14
 Zanjeer – 4/9
 Daag: A Poem of Love – 2/7
 Abhimaan – 2/4
 Namak Haraam – 2/3

See also
23rd Filmfare Awards
22nd Filmfare Awards
Filmfare Awards

References

https://www.imdb.com/event/ev0000245/1974/

Filmfare Awards
Filmfare
1974 in Indian cinema